William Smith (1721–1803) was an English civil servant who held the post of Treasurer of the Ordnance throughout the French Revolutionary Wars.

Early life
Christened on 3 May 1721 at the church of St. Peter the Great, Chichester, he was the eldest son of John Smith (1688–1749), a surgeon in Chichester, and his first wife Sarah Buckenham (1693–1732), daughter of the Reverend John Buckenham. His younger brother, the Reverend Charles Smith (1729–1803), became rector of West Stoke outside Chichester, while his sister, Anne Smith (1731–1806), married the Reverend William Webber, a Canon Residentiary of Chichester Cathedral, and became the mother of the Venerable Charles Webber, Archdeacon of Chichester.

After education at Winchester College, to which he was admitted in 1730, he was employed by Charles Lennox, 3rd Duke of Richmond as his secretary.

Career
In 1781 William was made a Justice of the Peace for Sussex. In 1782 the Duke became Master-General of the Ordnance and on 27 May 1782 had William appointed Treasurer of the Ordnance. Both resigned in 1783 but returned later that year, William regaining the Treasurership on 30 December 1783 and holding it for the rest of his life.

In the 1784 general election, the Duke persuaded William, against the advice of family and friends, to stand for the seat of Chichester which returned two MPs. He and the sitting MP, Thomas Steele, overtly supported the Duke but a third candidate George White Thomas, son-in-law of a popular past MP, entered the fray as an independent. The contest became heated, with William coming under personal attack over his public and his private life, and on polling day of 1 April 1784 he came last with only 23% of the vote. He did not attempt to re-enter politics.

Through his lifetime association with the Duke and holding a lucrative office from 1783 on, William became rich, owning at his death a country residence at West Ashling in the parish of Funtington, a freehold town house on Bryanston Street in the parish of St Marylebone, and lands in Hampshire. In addition he had major holdings of Government stock.

Family
He first married Jane Parker (1724–1780), daughter of George Parker of Amberley Castle, but they had no children. She brought him the manor of Denmead in the parish of Hambledon, which was sold in 1769. They lived at Droxford, where he was in 1754 when appointed trustee of the will of his great-aunt.

Before his wife's death he had begun an affair with Anne Vining Heron (1748–1805), the wife of Rear-Admiral Charles Webber (1722–1783), and was almost certainly the biological father of Anne's son James. Six months after the Admiral's death, at the church of St Marylebone on 24 November 1783 he married Anne and became stepfather to her children. The couple then had two daughters, together with a son who died young.

Dying on 12 October 1803, William was buried on 20 October 1803 at the church of St. Peter the Great, Chichester. After generous bequests to his wife, his will of 20 February 1802, proved in London on 3 November 1803, set up trust funds of 10,000 pounds, equivalent to over 815,000 pounds in 2014, for his four stepchildren and 40,000 pounds, say 3.26 million in 2014 pounds, for his two daughters Emily and Louisa. In addition he left all his real estate, worth at least 25,000 pounds (2.04 million now), and the residue of his personal estate to his stepson James, lawfully the Admiral's child, provided he took the name and arms of Smith. James did so, and as James Webber Smith rose to be a General in the British Army.

His elder daughter Emily Smith (1784–1861) in 1805 married mine owner Ralph Skinner Gowland (1758–1821), son of the MP Ralph Gowland, and had four children. Her younger sister Louisa Mary (1789–1850) in 1810 married John Edward Jones (1786–1854), a Royal Artillery officer who became a Major-General, and had eight children.

References

1721 births
1803 deaths
People from Chichester
People educated at Winchester College
English landowners
People from Funtington